Ivan Stevanović (born 18 May 1982) is a retired Croatian handball player.

He is one of the oldest players to debut for a national team at a major competition. He debuted at the 2016 European Championship in Poland as the second choice goalkeeper to Mirko Alilović, but he ended up being the biggest reason for his country winning the bronze medal.

Early life
Stevanović was born 18 May 1982 in Rijeka.

Stevanović grew up in the neighborhood of Trsat across the street from Dvorana Mladosti then the venue of RK Zamet.

At the age of eight Stevanović started to train swimming with Bistra Gospodinova as his coach.

At the end of the eight grade Stevanović was a goalkeeper for his schools handball team. Later he would train swimming and handball at the same time while opting for handball in the end.

Club career
Stevanović began his youth career in hometown club Trsat in which he played for five years in youth selection before playing as a senior at the age of 16. He also spent a year playing for Pećine in the then 1.B league before joining RK Zamet. During his early years at the club he was mostly coached by his colleague Valter Matošević.

He played for the club for seven years. He went from being third to first choice goalkeeper. With the club he played in EHF Cup Winners' Cup and EHF Cup, also coming to the finals of the Croatian Cup two times and keeping a position in the top 6 in the league.

In 2007 Stevanović moved to Poreč where he maintained a vital role in the clubs great results and qualification for the Challenger Cup. Even though there was talk of a transfer to Slovenia he opted for the Istrian side.
In 2009 Stevanović received an award from the city of Poreč for being their best male sportsperson for the year of 2008.

He also spent a season in Slovenian club RD Krško where he was trained by head coach Željko Babić.

Stevanović returned to Zamet in 2010. The next season Zamet came into the finals of the Croatian Cup, Stevanoviće's goalkeeping gave interest to Croatian champions Croatia Osiguranje Zagreb. Zagreb bought Stevanović in the summer of 2012. In his first season with the club Stevanović won the SEHA League. The next four seasons with Zagreb saw Stevanović winning domestic competitions and cups while reaching EHF Champions League quarter-finals and finishing third in the SEHA League.

On 5 December 2016 it was confirmed that Stevanović had signed a three-year contract with Swiss club Kadetten Schaffhausen stating that he would be leaving RK Zagreb at the end of the season.

International career
Stevanović was first called up for the Croatian national team by Lino Červar in 2007 for national team preparations in Poreč.

He was called up again in 2013 by coach Slavko Goluža to play at the 2013 Mediterranean Games in Mersin. Croatia lost in the finals against Egypt and got a silver medal.

He competed at the 2016 European Men's Handball Championship as a replacement for Filip Ivić who was injured.
At the beginning of the tournament Stevanović was second choice to Mirko Alilović but soon he became first choice and saved Croatia from being knocked out of the group stage. He had a very big role in Croatia winning the bronze medal. In August of the same year he played for the national team at the 2016 Summer Olympics in Rio de Janeiro where Croatia finished in fifth place. Stevanović was 7th best goalkeeper at the tournament with 35 save and a 31% percentage.

Stevanović was called up once again to train with the national team for the 2017 World Championship in France.

During a group stage match against Chile at the 2017 World Championship Stevanović scored from his goal post to an empty goal. He played a vital role in the quarter final match against Spain getting some crucial saves. Croatia finished in fourth place losing to Slovenia in the third place match. Stevanović had 47 saves at the end of the tournament with 31%.

On 26 January 2019 he confirmed he is going to retirement of the Croatian national team after 2019 World Men's Handball Championship.

Personal life
Stevanović is married, his wife's name is Irena. The couple have a son named Vigo. Stevanović has stated that he spends most of his free time with his son.

Honours
Club
Zamet
Croatian Cup
Finalist: 2000, 2001, 2012

PPD Zagreb
Dukat Premier League
Winner: 2012–13, 2013–14, 2014–15, 2015–16, 2016–17
Croatian Cup
Winner: 2013, 2014, 2015, 2016, 2017
SEHA League
Winner: 2012–13
Third: 2013–14, 2014–15, 2015–16

Kadetten Schaffhausen
SHV-Super Cup
Winner: 2017

International
Croatia
2013 Mediterranean Games – silver medal
2016 European Championship – bronze medal

Individual
Best sportsperson in Poreč – 2008
Dukat Premier League best saves average from 9m in 2010–11 season – 6,30 avg
Dukat Premier League best saves total from 9m in 2010–11 – 170
Best goalkeeper in Croatian Cup – 2012
Best goalkeeper at Schlecker Cup – 2013
SEHA League best saves total from 9m in 2013–14 season – 90 saves
Dukat Premier League best saves total from 6m in 2013–14 – 36,1%
SEHA League best 9m saves percentage in 2014–15 season – 56,4%
2016 EC: Poland vs Croatia man of the match
2016 European Championship 2nd best goalkeeper by percentage – 37%
SEHA League best saves percentage in 2015–16 season – 41,3%
SEHA League best 9m saves percentage in 2015–16 season – 53,6%
SEHA League best 6m saves percentage in 2015–16 season – 34,2%
SEHA League best 6m saves percentage in fastbreaks in 2015–16 season – 25,0%
SEHA League best goalkeeper in 2015–16 season
Dukat Premier League best saves percentage in 2015–16 season – 35,7%
2nd best Croatian handballer of 2016 by CHF & Sportske novosti
Best goalkeeper in SEHA League 2016–17 season
2018 European Championship man of the match: vs. Norway

References

External links

SEHA League/Premier League stats from 2010 onwards
Stevanović Eurohandball profile
Ivan Stevanović Scoresway profile

1982 births
Living people
Handball players from Rijeka
Croatian male handball players
RK Zamet players
RK Zagreb players
Wisła Płock (handball) players
Olympic handball players of Croatia
Handball players at the 2016 Summer Olympics
Expatriate handball players in Poland
Croatian expatriate sportspeople in Slovenia
Croatian expatriate sportspeople in Switzerland
 Croatian expatriate sportspeople in Poland
Mediterranean Games silver medalists for Croatia
Competitors at the 2013 Mediterranean Games
Mediterranean Games medalists in handball